Quebec is a small village in County Durham, in North East England. The village has a public house, the Hamsteels Inn, a hotel, Hamsteels Hall, a church, St. John the Baptist Hamsteels, a village hall, a playground and a used car dealership.

Administration

Civic
Quebec is for all purposes (historic, ceremonial and administrative) located in County Durham. The local police force is Durham Constabulary.

Political
Quebec is located in County Durham. It is in the Esh ward, which as of 2010 is represented on Durham County Council by Pat Glass (Labour). It is part of the North West Durham parliamentary constituency, which is represented in Parliament by Richard Holden, the constituency’s first Conservative MP. It is in the North East England region, which served as a constituency for the European Parliament until the United Kingdom left the European Union at the end of January 2020.

Geography
 Grid reference: 
 Latitude and longitude:  (54.78, −1.72)
 Elevation: 650 feet (200 m)
 Road access: Minor roads off B6301 and B6302
 Rail access: Durham,  by road
 Nearest large village: Esh Winning, 
 Nearest city: Durham,

History
The Roman road known as Dere Street passes through the village on its way from Yorkshire to Hadrian's Wall via the Roman fort at Lanchester.

Etymology
The village takes its unusual name from the more famous city of Quebec, Canada. The fields in the area were enclosed in 1759, the year Quebec was captured from France. It was common at the time for fields distant from their home farm to be given the names of foreign lands, and cases where these names have come to be applied to whole villages are numerous throughout the North East of England. For example, not far away is the village of Toronto.

Sport
In 1902, after the village's Hamsteels Rugby Club was beaten 77-0 in a match at Quebec against Hartlepool Rovers, the West Hartlepool Mail's rugby correspondent described Quebec as an "outlandish place". Today, the village has only football teams.  Two of these, Hamsteels Inn FC and the Hammers FC, play at Quebec's Hamsteels Colliery Welfare Ground, while a third, Steelers FC, is based in Langley Park.

At the age of 20, Chris Waddle was working in Quebec's former meat factory, Hamsteels Frozen Foods, when he was signed by Newcastle United in 1980 from nearby Northern League side Tow Law Town for £1,000.

References

External links

 Aerial photograph from Multimap

Villages in County Durham